Resident Advisor (also known as RA) is an online music magazine and community platform dedicated to showcasing electronic music, artists and events across the globe. It was established in 2001. RAs editorial team provides news, music and event reviews, as well as films, features and interviews. The website also manages services that include event listings, ticket sales, club and promoter directories, photo galleries, artist and record label profiles, DJ charts, an online community, and the RA Podcast.

The company has its headquarters in London, with additional offices in Berlin, Los Angeles, Sydney and Tokyo. The website won a People's Voice award in the 12th Annual Webby Awards in 2008.

In October 2020, following the negative impact of the COVID-19 pandemic on British arts and culture organisations, RA received £750,000 from the Arts Council of England as part of the UK's Culture Recovery Fund initiative.

History 
Resident Advisor was founded in Sydney, Australia in 2001 by Paul Clement and Nick Sabine as a website for providing news and information relating to the Australian dance music scene.

As Resident Advisor grew both Clement and Sabine initially kept their day jobs and hired staff to help with the site. In 2006, after Clement and Sabine had moved to the UK, they both began working full time on Resident Advisor and incorporated the company in the UK, with an office in Berlin opening 2007.

RA Tickets was unveiled in 2008 to allow promoters of electronic music to sell tickets. RA Tickets launched a face-value ticket resale system.

In January 2014, the first complete redesign in the site's history was announced, adding mobile support, responsive design, a new logo, full SoundCloud integration on artist pages and other features. At that time, Resident Advisor started to have more than two million users per month.

An article in The New York Times, published in July 2015, cites the website's audience reaching 2.5 million monthly active users. It mentions Resident Advisor as "one of the most influential E.D.M.-focused sites".

The company launched its first consumer-focused iOS app in 2015. The RA Guide, free in the App Store (iOS), takes the site's listings for clubs, festivals and concerts to the mobile market. Apple featured RA as a curator, with the launch of Apple Music, to contribute electronic music playlists to the streaming service.

In October 2020, following criticism within the UK dance music community, RA was forced to defend receiving an Arts Council of England grant for £750,000. The award was part of a wider tranche of grants, made available via the Culture Recovery Fund, intended to aid arts organisations that were suffering economically as a result of COVID-19 restrictions.

At the start of 2021, Resident Advisor launched a redesign of their existing website. The new design also coincided with a change to their domain name, migrating from residentadvisor.net to ra.co.

Other media 
The RA Podcast is a weekly mix of electronic music from top producers and DJs. It launched on 6 March 2006 with a mix from Troy Pierce. In 2010, Resident Advisor started a second podcast series titled the RA Exchange. The site defines the RA Exchange as a series of conversations with artists (e.g., Guy Gerber, Morgan Geist, and New Order), labels (e.g., Defected Records, Future Classic, and Rush Hour), and promoters (e.g., Decibel, MUTEK, and Sónar) shaping the electronic music landscape.

In 2011, Resident Advisor produced a series of short documentaries titled Real Scenes.

Annual polls 
From 2006 to 2016 Resident Advisor conducted two annual voting polls at the end of each year under the name RA Poll. The first polls the publications readers, who are asked to vote for their top 100 DJs and live acts of the year.

Resident Advisor ceased the polls in 2017 due to concerns about diversity and their growing influence on the music industry.

References

External links 
 

Online music magazines published in the United Kingdom
Dance music magazines published in England
Magazines established in 2001
Magazines published in London
2001 establishments in Australia